The Supportersvereniging Ajax (SVA) (English: "Supporters Club Ajax") also known as Ajax Life is an organisation linked to AFC Ajax football club, based in Amsterdam, Netherlands.

The group is independent of the club and consists of a variety of members. Every member is considered an Ajacied,  but with different needs the club caters to the various demands and necessities of its members. Some are fans with a season ticket, including away card holders as well as members who occasionally visit competitions or follow the club through the media.

Members of the SVA hail from all over the Netherlands, with an active branch situated in Belgium as well. The average membership counts between 110.000 and 125.000 members, making it the largest Supporters club in the Netherlands. The average age of its members are 35 years of age, and approximately 9% of the clubs members are season ticket holders.

The Supportersvereniging Ajax are also members of the Football Supporters Europe (FSE) a platform of negotiation to communicate the interest of club supporters to UEFA.

Events 
The SVA are widely responsible for the events surrounding the annual Ajax Open Training's Day, an event which takes place at the start of every season where the new Ajax squad members are introduced to the public in the Amsterdam Arena. The event takes place in and around the team's home stadium and the neighboring training ground Sportpark De Toekomst. The event attracts thousands of spectators each year, and is one of the largest pre-season events surrounding the club from Amsterdam.

The Supporters club has often appeared in the media in the Netherlands to take a stance on topics such as Stadium bans, where Supporters are prohibited from visiting away matches due to past incidences.

Ajax Life 

The SVA are also responsible for the Ajax Life website, as well as the Ajax Life newspaper, a bi-weekly publication with 20 issues appearing per year. The publication is delivered by mail to all members of the club with a reported total circulation of 94,000.

Ajax Kids Club
Along with the Ajax Life membership, the SVA also offer membership for children ages 0–12 to the Ajax Kids Club. A combined effort with the actual football club Ajax, the Kids Club offers several events geared towards children centered on the team mascot Lucky Lynx and the football club, including the Ajax Kids Clubblad (kids magazine) with 8 issues appearing per year.

Board and Staff
The board consists of the following members:
President: Daniël Dekker 
Secretary: Tijn van Hooven 
Treasurer: Patrick van Amelsvoort
Board member Supporters Policy: Ine van Brenk
Board member General Affairs: Martine Eikelhof

See also
 AFCA Supportersclub
 Ajax Business Associates

References

External links
De SVA official website in the Netherlands 
De SVA official website in Belgium 

AFC Ajax
Dutch football supporters' associations